Salmela is a Finnish surname.

Geographical distribution
As of 2014, 81.1% of all known bearers of the surname Salmela were residents of Finland (frequency 1:1,061), 9.0% of the United States (1:628,263), 4.4% of Sweden (1:35,293), 2.4% of Estonia (1:8,638) and 1.2% of Australia (1:316,985).jk

In Finland, the frequency of the surname was higher than national average (1:1,061) in the following regions:
 1. Central Ostrobothnia (1:289)
 2. Lapland (1:290)
 3. North Ostrobothnia (1:466)
 4. Central Finland (1:839)
 5. Pirkanmaa (1:1,035)

People
Anssi Salmela (born 1984), Finnish ice hockey defenceman
Hugo Salmela (1884–1918), Red Guard military leader
Jukka Salmela (born 1958), Finnish speedskater
Martta Salmela-Järvinen (1892–1987), Finnish politician and author
Minna Salmela (born 1971), Finnish swimmer 
Saku Salmela (born 1990), Finnish ice hockey defenceman

See also
Art Centre Salmela in Finland

References

Finnish-language surnames
Surnames of Finnish origin